Rohey Taalah (born 1993 in Oslo, Norway) is a Norwegian soul and jazz singer.

Biography 
Taalah studied music at Toneheim Folk High School (2012–13), before attending the jazz program at the Norwegian University of Science and Technology (2013–16). She was a member of the Norwegian future soul quartet Rohey. They have toured extensively throughout Norway and Scandinavia, visiting most festivals and venues on the road. Rohey released their debut album A Million Things in 2017 on the label Jazzland Recordings.

In 2018, she released the album Run, Boy, Run with the vocal trio Gurls including Hanna Paulsberg and Ellen Andrea Wang on the Grappa label.

Discography 
 With Rohey
 2017: A Million Things (Jazzland)

 With Gurls
 2018: Run Boy, Run (Grappa)

References

External links 
 

1993 births
Living people
21st-century Norwegian singers
Norwegian jazz upright-bassists
Norwegian women jazz singers
Norwegian jazz singers
Musicians from Oslo
21st-century Norwegian women singers
21st-century double-bassists
Jazzland Recordings (1997) artists
Grappa Music artists